Sherwood is a computer animated science fiction streaming television series created by Diana Manson and Megan Laughton that premiered on March 6, 2019, on YouTube Premium. It is a new telling of the Robin Hood legend. Some reviewers have noted the focus on socioeconomic class, as Robin lives among "the impoverished 99%," leading rebels who will overthrow the Sheriff, who lives in an Upper City housing "the wealthy citizens of Sherwood." Others also noted the focus on class difference, with Robin and her comrades trying to "overcome inequality and fight for justice." Apart from this, others said the series has a cyberpunk feeling to it.

The show had a world premiere in Sydney, Australia, in March 2019. In April 2020, Sherwood was one of the originals that Google decided to make freely available in light of the pandemic. Even though the show's season one episodes aired in March 2019, official accounts on Twitter and Instagram regularly post content about the show.

Premise
In the year 2270, in the dystopic 23rd century, 14-year-old hacker Robin Loxley and her friends battle the Sheriff of Nottingham in a Britain devastated by environmental disaster.

Characters

Main
 Robin Loxley (voiced by Anya Chalotra) is the main protagonist of the series. She often has to fight and steal from the Sheriff of Nottingham, to protect Sherwood. She is called "Insurgent Hood" by the Sheriff and his allies, also once takes the alias of "Marian Johns."
 Iniko (voiced by Tyler Posey) is one of the main protagonists, the pilot of the submarine Amphy, and a self proclaimed Sea Pirate.
 Gisbourne (voiced by Aneurin Barnard) is the son of the Sheriff of Nottingham and is the Head of Security of the Regime. He often commands the Drobos and attempts to catch the Insurgents.
 Sheriff Nottingham (voiced by Joseph Fiennes) is the main antagonist of the Sherwood series and rules the Upper City. He is the head of the Regime, with Gisbourne as his Head of Security (and son).

Supporting
 Tui (voiced by Rachel House) is like a mother to Robin, and helps her around the Kelp Farm. 
 Gripper (voiced by Adetokumboh M'Cormack) is part of Robin's crew and acts like a father to Juba.
 Rose Trefgarne (voiced by Jamie Chung) is a protagonist, often helping out the main cast. Formerly a resident of The Upper City, she now resides in Sherwood.
 Thomas Loxley (voiced by Darrill Rosen) is a scientist and inventor, and is the father of Robin Loxley.
 Juba (voiced by Neneh Conteh) is a small girl with dark skin and light blonde hair like Gripper and who is a refugee before she came to Sherwood.

Production
The idea for the series was originally posed by Diana Manson and Megan Laughton, of a New York company named Baby Octopus, in 2016, to Justin Trefgarne. Additionally, the show is, according to Trefgarne, aimed at "the pre-teen market," and is focused "on positive female empowerment." The production company, Baby Octopus, worked with the Computer Science in Media team of Google to help imagine "world of the future and what it meant for design, travel, technology and society," and to inspire "young women and girls on their role in technology of the future." Trefgarne, in a August 2018 post on his website, noted that he was commissioned to write the pilot script in 2016, with YouTube ordering nine additional episodes in January 2017, and continued production, with an original release date in November 2018. He also stated that the series is "inspired by the classic Manga Akira," a Japanese cyberpunk manga series set in a post-apocalyptic and futuristic Neo-Tokyo, more than two decades after a mysterious explosion destroyed the city.

In February 2019, a number of behind-the-scenes specials were released about the show. In the first one, on February 22, director Bruce Carter talked about the setting of the show in a futuristic London, which those in this story call "Sherwood," with the story based around Robin and her "merry band" of followers. In the same special, executive producer Nanette Miles said that the show would inspire "lots of young girls," production designer Daniel McKay called Robin a "tinkerer" who can easily adapt technology, and production coordinator Freya Walker Smith called her a "cool girl" who fights for herself and a "powerful heroine who can code." In the second special, on February 26, music producers Jacob Yoffee and Roahn Hylton said they wanted to make the audience pay attention and listen to what is going on in the story, trying to make the world larger and feel more realistic. Yoffee also said that Bruce Carter, wanted a futuristic sound, with world music "more infused" into the mainstream and said they worked with Mickey Shiloh, on all the songs. Hylton also described Robin as a hero "everyone can get behind," with her theme having a "superhero element" to it, plus a "bit of sadness" because she is searching "for her identity." In the last special, on February 28, Anya Chalotra, who voices Robin, said that if she was 14, Robin would be her friend and would inspire (and empower) her. Chalotra further called Robin self-sufficient and dedicated to "making the world a better place" which is more equal, talked about the challenge of playing such a "complex character" and stated she "sets an amazing example of a young leader." At the same time, Erin Rainaldi, a software engineer from Verily who works on the show, said that it's important to show that women and girls are just as good at "technology and tinkering" than boys, saying it sets an example for young girls, and Jamie Chung, who voices Rose, called Robin fun and a rebel, hoping the show does the same in speaking to young girls. Bernadette Carter, a software engineer from Google called Robin a "strong female lead," not letting others tell her what to do, while balancing it with compassion for others, and is determined and dedicated to her goals.

Episodes

Season 1 (2019)

Reception
Common Sense Media, a family-friendly media review site, gave the series an aggregate of three stars, stating its themes made it suitable for older viewers. Alexis Gunderson of Paste Magazine listed it as one of the 13 Best Original TV Shows on YouTube Premium in 2019. Gunderson said that while it may look similar to Star Wars: The Clone Wars, it is an original, with visually layered scenes and set in a "distressing believable" dystopia, while saying she appreciates it for its own merits, calling it a compelling family-friendly animation. Apart from this, in the show's first week on YouTube, the show's first episode garnered seven million views, something which series writer and developer Justin Trefgarne said he was delighted by.

Notes

References

External links
Official website

Official Instagram account

2010s American animated television series
2019 American television series debuts
Fantasy web series
American animated web series
Animated science fiction web series
American children's animated adventure television series
Fictional hackers
Works about computer hacking
YouTube Premium original series
2010s YouTube series
Robin Hood television series
Teen animated television series